In 1958, the upswing in violence against the government of South Vietnam continued, much of which was committed by the communist-dominated insurgents now called the Viet Cong.  In South Vietnam, President Ngo Dinh Diem appeared to be firmly in power, although many American officials expressed concern about the repressive nature of his regime.  The United States continued to finance most of the budget of the government of South Vietnam.  North Vietnam continued to campaign for reunification with the South while focusing on its internal economic development, but pressure from hard-pressed communists in the South was forcing the North to contemplate a more active military role in overthrowing the Diem government.

January
 8 January
U.S. Ambassador Elbridge Durbrow and the heads of other U.S. government agencies in South Vietnam gave a negative assessment of the Diem government to Washington.  They stated that discontent with the Diem government in rural areas was growing and a growing problem with internal security was anticipated. In the cities, Diem's secretive Cần Lao Party had succeeded in infiltrating many organizations and was feared. General Samuel Tankersley Williams, head of the Military Assistance Advisory Group (MAAG) for Vietnam, refused to concur with the report stating that he did not have "concern regarding internal security, the economic situation, or the executive ability of the government of [South] Vietnam."

 23 January
Troubled by reports of oppression in South Vietnam, Socialist Norman Thomas resigned from the American Friends of Vietnam, a prominent lobbying group which supported the Diem government.

February
February 12
A South Vietnamese army truck was ambushed by insurgents and all occupants were killed. This was one of several attacks in February on government and military personnel in the Mekong Delta region of southernmost South Vietnam.

 28 February 
Three hundred Bình Xuyên insurgents attacked the Minh Thanh Rubber Plantation north of Saigon. The Government sent two divisions of army troops to attempt to hunt down the insurgents. Most of the incidents of violence in South Vietnam were committed by the remnants of the Binh Xuyen criminal gang and the Cao Đài and Hòa Hảo religious sects which had been suppressed by the Diem government in 1955 and 1956.  Viet Cong "political advisers" were often attached to the insurgents.

March
As part of their efforts to advance the Unification referendum, North Vietnam sent letters to the Government of South Vietnam proposing a loosening of economic restrictions between the two countries and preparations for a "free general elections by secret ballot". The messages were either rebuffed or ignored by the South Vietnamese government.

April
 18 April
At a communist party meeting, Prime Minister of North Vietnam Phạm Văn Đồng stated the North should pursue reunification of Vietnam by peaceful means. The statement highlighted a dispute among North Vietnamese leaders.  Lê Duẩn and Lê Đức Thọ favored support for an insurgency in South Vietnam to unite the two Vietnams by force.

 30 April
The CIA estimated that the Viet Cong numbered 1,700 armed men.

June
To defend themselves against the offensives of the South Vietnamese army, the Viet Cong — contrary to the wishes of North Vietnam — began organizing themselves into military units. The first battalion of Viet Cong troops was established in Zone D in mid-1958.

July
Communist party leaders met with representatives of the highland Montagnard people in Quang Ngai Province of South Vietnam to plan an uprising against the Diem government.

(approximate date) Chinese Premier Zhou Enlai's advice to the North Vietnamese government was that it should focus on promoting "socialist revolution and reconstruction in the North."  Zhou said that "realization of revolutionary transformation in the South was impossible at this stage."  The North should await "proper opportunities." China was not enthusiastic about a military attempt by North Vietnam to unify the two Vietnams.  
  
 25 July
The U.S. Embassy in Saigon reported to Washington that "in many remote areas the central government [of South Vietnam] has no effective control."

August
 10 August
An insurgent force of 400 men raided the Michelin Rubber Plantation north of Saigon. The plantation was defended by a company security force and 200 South Vietnamese soldiers. The defenders were taken by surprise and lost more than 100 weapons and $143,000 in cash. The raid was led by a Bình Xuyên commander with Viet Cong advisers. President Diem had visited the rubber plantation only a week earlier.

 18 August
General Williams, the head of MAAG, opposed the use of the South Vietnamese army to respond to the growing number of Viet Cong attacks. He believed that the primary duty of the army was to contest an invasion of South Vietnam by the North Vietnamese army, a remote possibility in the view of most U.S. officials. MAAG training and equipment for the South Vietnamese army was focused on creating an army capable of fighting a conventional war.

Despite William's objections, in the latter part of 1958 the South Vietnamese army carried out several inconclusive operations against Viet Cong strongholds in the Mekong Delta (including the Plain of Reeds).

September
Hilaire du Berrier published an article in the conservative magazine The American Mercury highly critical of the Diem government and its American supporters.  Du Berrier said that Diem "was imposed on a people who never wanted him" and that the American public had "not been told the truth."  He characterized U.S. policy as "misguided meddling" and the Diem government as a "police state."

 8 September
Chinese leader Mao Zedong introduced his "noose strategy" in a speech to Supreme State Council of China.  He said that each new commitment of the United States overseas was a hangman's noose around America's neck.  The multiplying commitments would ultimately strangle the U.S. and lead to the failure of "U.S. imperialism."

October
 4 October 
The Ugly American, an anti-communist novel by Eugene Burdick and William Lederer, was published and serialized in The Saturday Evening Post. The novel was a scathing indictment of the personnel of the United States Department of State and other U.S. government agencies in the fictional Southeast Asian country of Sarakan, easily identifiable as South Vietnam. The book was influential and a bestseller. The hero of the book was modeled on CIA operative Colonel Edward Lansdale, a close collaborator of President Diem from 1954 to 1957.  Most Americans working in Southeast Asia were portrayed as being insulated from the people of the country in which they lived.  The communists by contrast worked in the villages winning "hearts and minds". The book has been criticized for its paternalistic portrayal of Southeast Asians and the simplistic solutions it advanced to defeat communism.

The Ugly American contrasted sharply with Graham Greene's 1955 novel The Quiet American which portrayed a Lansdale-like character as naive and ineffective.

December
Le Duan, First Secretary of the Communist Party of Vietnam, made a clandestine visit to South Vietnam to assess the situation of the Viet Cong and the resistance to the Diem regime. North Vietnam assessed late-1958 and early-1959 as the "darkest period" of the communists in South Vietnam when the forces of South Vietnam "truly and efficiently destroyed our party." Communist party membership declined and nearly disappeared in some parts of South Vietnam.

The PAVN and Pathet Lao occupied several villages in the Tchepone district of Laos, near the Demilitarized Zone dividing North from South Vietnam. North Vietnam claimed the villages had historically been part of Vietnam.

The Diem government of South Vietnam, by the end of 1958, had killed 12,000 persons and arrested 40,000 in its campaign to repress the communists and other opposition in South Vietnam.

References

Vietnam War by year
War
Vietnam
United States history timelines